Plarium Global Ltd. is a video game developer, publisher and subsidiary of the Australian gambling machine manufacturer Aristocrat Leisure Limited. It is known for creating mobile, desktop and browser games in various genres including MMO, RPG, action, strategy, and casual.

Plarium has more than 435 million players worldwide. Its games are available on iOS, Android, the Microsoft Store and on PC/Mac via the game launcher Plarium Play.

The company has more than 1300 employees and has established studios in Herzliya (established 2009 and current headquarters), Kharkiv, Lviv, Kyiv, Odesa and Michigan. In addition, Plarium acquired San Francisco-based Rumble Games in 2017 and, in 2021, Helsinki-based studio Futureplay.

There are more than 20 games in the Plarium portfolio. Plarium's most popular game is the dark fantasy collection RPG Raid: Shadow Legends, which has more than 80 million downloads. Other Plarium titles include Mech Arena, Vikings: War of Clans, the Stormfall franchise (Stormfall: Age of War, Stormfall: Rise of Balur, Stormfall: Saga of Survival) and Lost Island: Blast Adventure.

Plarium has worked with celebrities, content creators, and notable Esports professionals in a promotional capacity, including Richard Tyler "Ninja" Blevins, Oleksandr "s1mple" Kostyliev of the Esports team NAVI, and actor Jeff Goldblum.

Plarium has previously employed BAFTA award winner Jesper Kyd, known for his work on video games such as Assassin's Creed and Borderlands, to compose the music for its games.

History
Plarium was founded in 2009 in Herzliya, Israel, where it is headquartered, and started out by developing games for the Eastern European casual gaming market, such as Farmandia.

In 2011, Plarium began developing massively multiplayer online strategy games, and in February of that year the company released Total Domination which reached 20 million users.

In November 2012, Plarium released Stormfall: Age of War, which was one of the fastest growing social games on Facebook.

On November 10, 2015, Plarium licensed characters of Alien vs. Predator from 20th Century Fox to add them to its Soldiers Inc. game.

On 10 August 2017, Aristocrat Leisure Limited announced its acquisition of Plarium for a $500 million upfront payment plus an earn-out arrangement to shareholders.

Plarium released RAID: Shadow Legends on mobile in March 2019. The game was released on PC and Mac in 2020.

The Plarium Play desktop launcher was released on PC and Mac in April 2019. It is a free launcher that serves as a distribution platform for Plarium games.

On 12 August 2021, Plarium released the PvP team shooter Mech Arena on iOS and Android devices. Plarium and the players of Mech Arena made a combined donation of $100,000 (USD) to the charitable foundation AbleGamers in February 2022. On 3 August 2022, the game was released on PC and Mac via Plarium Play.

On 10 March 2022, as a response to the ongoing suffering of its employees and the people of Ukraine, Plarium Global Ltd. made the decision to remove all of its games from the app stores and ceased accepting Plarium Play and Plarium.com payments in Russia and Belarus until further notice.

Reception
Plarium's Stormfall: Age of War made "Top 20 Facebook apps" chart during its 2012 launch, and was one of the fastest growing Facebook apps by monthly active users at that time. Facebook's Director of Game Partnerships Sean Ryan called it a "beautiful-looking game" when it launched in November 2012.

In 2013, Facebook named Soldiers Inc. as one of the best new social games of the year.

In 2014, Plarium was named one of Europe's most promising startups by Wired UK journalist Madhumita Venkataramanan.

In 2014, Facebook's Director of Platform Partnerships, Julien Codorniou mentioned Plarium as one of the top global gaming companies on the Facebook platform.

VentureBeat mentioned Plarium in March 2014 as one of the standalone gaming companies prioritizing social games on the Facebook platform.

Plarium's RAID: Shadow Legends was nominated for the 2019 Google Play Users’ Choice Awards in the "Games" category. The game was also nominated for the "Game of the Year" and "Best Audio/Visual Accomplishment" categories at the 2020 Pocket Gamer Mobile Games Awards. It was featured as "Game of the Day" on the App Store and won the best "App Video" award at the 2020 App Growth Awards.

Plarium's game Mech Arena was the App Store's "Game of the Day'' on 15 October 2021.

In July 2022, RAID: Shadow Legends crossed $1 billion (USD) in lifetime revenue, becoming "one of the world’s most lucrative RPGs."

Plarium games

Sources

External links
 

Video game companies established in 2009
Israeli companies established in 2009
Video game development companies
Video game companies of Israel
2017 mergers and acquisitions